László Krasznahorkai (born 5 January 1954) is a Hungarian novelist and screenwriter known for difficult and demanding novels, often labeled postmodern, with dystopian and melancholic themes. Several of his works, including his novels Satantango (1985) and The Melancholy of Resistance (1989), have been turned into feature films by Hungarian film director Béla Tarr.

Early life and education
Krasznahorkai was born in Gyula, Hungary on 5 January 1954 to a middle-class Jewish family on his father's side. His father, György Krasznahorkai, was a lawyer and his mother, Júlia Pálinkás, a social security administrator.

In 1972 Krasznahorkai graduated from the Erkel Ferenc high school where he specialized in Latin. From 1973 to 1976 he studied law at the József Attila University (now University of Szeged) and from 1976 to 1978 at Eötvös Loránd University (ELTE) in Budapest. From 1978 to 1983 he studied Hungarian language and literature at ELTE Faculty of Humanities, receiving his degree. His thesis was on the work and experiences of writer and journalist Sándor Márai (1900–1989) after he fled the Communist regime in 1948. During his years as a literature student, Krasznahorkai worked at the publishing company Gondolat Könyvkiadó.

Career as writer
Since completing his university studies, Krasznahorkai has supported himself as an independent author. In 1985, his debut novel Satantango achieved success, and he was immediately thrust into the forefront of Hungarian literary life. The book is a dystopian novel set in his homeland of Hungary, and is considered his best known work. It received a Best Translated Book Award in English in 2013.

He travelled outside of Communist Hungary for the first time in 1987, spending a year in West Berlin as a recipient of a DAAD fellowship. Since the collapse of the Soviet Bloc, he has lived in a variety of locations. In 1990, for the first time, he was able to spend a significant amount of time in East Asia. He drew upon his experiences in Mongolia and China in writing The Prisoner of Urga and Destruction and Sorrow Beneath the Heavens. He has returned many times to China.

In 1993, his novel The Melancholy of Resistance received the German Bestenliste-Prize for the best literary work of the year. In 1996, he was a guest of the Wissenschaftskolleg in Berlin. While completing the novel War and War, he travelled widely across Europe. The American poet Allen Ginsberg was of great assistance in completing the work; Krasznahorkai resided for some time in Ginsberg's New York apartment, and he described the poet's friendly advice as valuable in bringing the book to life.

In 1996, 2000, and 2005 he spent six months in Kyoto. His contact with the aesthetics and literary theory of the Far East resulted in significant changes in his writing style and deployed themes. He returns often to both Germany and Hungary, but he has also spent varying lengths of time in several other countries, including the United States, Spain, Greece, and Japan, providing inspiration for his novel Seiobo There Below, which won the Best Translated Book Award in 2014.

Beginning in 1985, the director and the author's friend Béla Tarr made films almost exclusively based on Krasznahorkai's works, including Sátántangó and Werckmeister Harmonies. Krasznahorkai said the 2011 film The Turin Horse would be their last collaboration. Krasznahorkai has also collaborated closely with the artist Max Neumann, including on the illustrated novella Chasing Homer (2021), which is accompanied by an original percussive score from the jazz musician Szilveszter Miklós.

Krasznahorkai has received international acclaim from critics. Susan Sontag described him as "the contemporary Hungarian master of apocalypse who inspires comparison with Gogol and Melville". W. G. Sebald remarked, "The universality of Krasznahorkai's vision rivals that of Gogol's Dead Souls and far surpasses all the lesser concerns of contemporary writing." In 2015, he received the Man Booker International Prize, the first Hungarian author to be so awarded.

Personal life
After residing in Berlin, Germany for several years, where he was for six months S. Fischer Guest Professor at the Free University of Berlin, Krasznahorkai currently resides "as a recluse in the hills of Szentlászló" in Hungary. After divorcing his first wife, Anikó Pelyhe, whom he had married in 1990, he married Dóra Kopcsányi, a sinologist and graphic designer, in 1997. He has three children: Kata, Ágnes and Emma.

Works

Novels
 1985: Satantango (Sátántangó), translated by George Szirtes (New Directions, 2012).
 1989: The Melancholy of Resistance (Az ellenállás melankóliája), translated by George Szirtes (New Directions, 2000).
 1992: The Prisoner of Urga (Az urgai fogoly).
 1999: War & War (Háború és háború), translated by George Szirtes (New Directions, 2006).
 2004: Destruction and Sorrow Beneath the Heavens (Rombolás és bánat az Ég alatt), translated by Ottilie Mulzet (Seagull Books, 2016).
 2008: Seiobo There Below (Seiobo járt odalent), translated by Ottilie Mulzet (New Directions, 2013).
 2016: Baron Wenckheim's Homecoming (Báró Wenckheim hazatér), translated by Ottilie Mulzet (New Directions, 2019).
 2021: Herscht 07769. To be translated by Ottilie Mulzet for New Directions.

Novellas
 2003: A Mountain to the North, a Lake to the South, Paths to the West, a River to the East (Északról hegy, Délről tó, Nyugatról utak, Keletről folyó), translated by Ottilie Mulzet (New Directions, 2022).
 2009: The Last Wolf (Az utolsó farkas), translated by George Szirtes (New Directions, 2016; paired with John Batki's translation of "Herman" and "The Death of a Craft" from Relations of Grace).
 2018: Spadework for a Palace (Aprómunka egy palotaért), translated by John Batki (New Directions, 2022).
 2019: Chasing Homer (Mindig Homérosznak), with illustrations by Max Neumann, translated by John Batki (New Directions, 2021).

Short story collections
 1986: Relations of Grace (Kegyelmi viszonyok), to be translated by John Batki for New Directions.
 Includes: "The Last Boat", "The Bogdanovich Story", "Trapped Rye", "Heat", "Herman: The Game Warden", "The Death of a Craft", "In the Barber's Grasp" and "The Station Seeker".
 2013: The World Goes On (Megy a világ). Translations by John Batki, George Szirtes and Ottilie Mulzet (New Directions, 2017).

Individual short stories 
 1984: "The Bogdanovich Story" ("El Bogdanovichtól"). Trans. Eszter Molnár, in Thy Kingdom Come: 19 Short Stories by 11 Hungarian Authors (pp. 64–79).
 1986: "The Last Boat" ("Az utolsó hajó"). Trans. Eszter Molnár, in Thy Kingdom Come: 19 Short Stories by 11 Hungarian Authors (pp. 53–63); later by George Szirtes in Music & Literature No. 2 (2013)
 1998: "Isaiah Has Come" ("Megjött Ézsaiás"). Translated by George Szirtes, included in War & War.
 1999: "Dumb to the Deaf" ("Néma a süketnek"). Trans. Eszter Molnár, in The Hungarian Quarterly, Summer 2000 (pp. 49-55).
 2010: "The Bill: For Palma Vecchio, at Venice" ("Számla: Palma Vecchiónak, Velencébe"), translated by George Szirtes (Sylph Editions, 2013) and included in The World Goes On.

Essays, interviews and other works
 1993: The Universal Theseus (A Théseus-általános), three fictional lectures. Translated by John Batki, included in The World Goes On.
 2001: Evening at Six: Some Free Exhibition-Opening Speeches (Este hat; néhány szabad megnyitás), essays.
 2003: Krasznahorkai: Conversations (Krasznahorkai Beszélgetések), interviews.
 2010: Animalinside (Állatvanbent), together with Max Neumann, collage of prose and pictures, translated by Ottilie Mulzet (New Directions, 2011; Sylph Editions, 2012).
 2012: He Neither Answers Nor Questions: Twenty-five Conversations on the Same Subject (Nem kérdez, nem válaszol. Huszonöt beszélgetés ugyanarról.), interviews.
 2013: Music & Literature No. 2, book length special issue of the magazine with texts by Krasznahorkai and essays on his work by Béla Tarr and Max Neumann.
 2017: The Manhattan Project, a literary diary with a photographic essay, translated by John Batki (Sylph Editions, 2017).

Screenplays for films
 1988: Damnation (Kárhozat), directed by Béla Tarr.
 1989: The Last Boat (Az utolsó hajó), directed by Béla Tarr.
 1994: Sátántangó, directed by Béla Tarr.
 1997–2001: Werckmeister Harmonies (Werckmeister harmóniák), directed by Béla Tarr.
 2007: The Man from London (A Londoni férfi), directed by Béla Tarr.
 2011: The Turin Horse (A torinói ló), directed by Béla Tarr.

Honors and awards
Krasznahorkai has been honored with numerous literary prizes, among them the highest award of the Hungarian state, the Kossuth Prize, and the Man Booker International Prize for his English-translated oeuvre.
2021: Austrian State Prize for European Literature
2020: Literature.gr Phrase of the Year Prize 2018 
 2019: National Book Award for Translated Literature (USA) for Baron Wenckheim's Homecoming 
2017: Aegon Art Award for Baron Wenckheim's Homecoming (Hungary)
 2015: Man Booker International Prize
 2015: The New York Public Library's Dorothy and Lewis B. Cullman Center for Scholars and Writers Fellow
 2014: Vilenica Prize (Vilenica International Literary Festival, Slovenia)
 2014: Best Translated Book Award, winner for Seiobo There Below, translated from the Hungarian by Ottilie Mulzet. First author to win two BTBA awards.
 2014: America Award for a lifetime contribution to international writing
 2013: Best Translated Book Award, winner for Satantango, translated from the Hungarian by George Szirtes
 2012: Prima Primissima Prize (Budapest, Hungary)
 2010: Brücke-Berlin Prize (Berlin, Germany) for Seiobo There Below
 2010: Spycher-Prize (Leuk, Switzerland) for his complete work but in particular for From the North a Mountain, ...
 2009: Prize of the Society of Writers (Budapest, Hungary)
 2008: Hungarian Heritage-Award, (Budapest, Hungary)
 2007: Nominated for Jean Monnet Prize (France)
 2004: Kossuth Prize (Hungary)
 2003: Soros Foundation Prize
 2002: Laureate of the Hungarian Republic (Magyar Köztársaság Babérkoszorúja)
 1998: Márai Sándor Prize (Hungarian Ministry of Education and Culture)
 1993: Krúdy Gyula Prize (Hungary)
 1993: Bestenliste-Prize (Baden-Baden, Germany) for The Melancholy of Resistance
 1992: Déry Tibor Award (Hungary)
 1987–1988: DAAD Fellowship (West Berlin, Federal Republic of Germany)
 1987: József Attila Prize (Hungary)
 1987: Mikes Kelemen Kör Prize (The Netherlands)

References

Further reading
 Auerbach, David. "The Mythology of László Krasznahorkai," The Quarterly Conversation, 7 June 2010
 
 The Rumpus review of Seiobo There Below
 Wood, James. "Madness and Civilization: The very strange fictions of László Krasznahorkai," The New Yorker, 4 July 2011, pp. 71–75.

External links
 
 

1954 births
Living people
People from Gyula
Hungarian Jews
20th-century Hungarian novelists
20th-century Hungarian male writers
21st-century Hungarian novelists
21st-century Hungarian male writers
Hungarian screenwriters
Male screenwriters
Postmodern writers
Hungarian male novelists
International Booker Prize winners
Hungarian short story writers